Jennifer Pareja Lisalde (born 8 May 1984) is a former Spanish female water polo player who won the gold medal at the 2013 World Championships in Barcelona, being named Most Valuable Player of the event.

She was named 2013 Best Female Water Polo Player of the Year by FINA.

Pareja competed at the 2012 Summer Olympics with the Spain national team in the women's event, winning the silver medal. She scored 12 goals and was named to the Olympic All-Star Team. She was the joint top sprinter at the 2012 Olympics, with 21 sprints won.

In 2014 she also won gold at European Championship in Budapest.

See also
 Spain women's Olympic water polo team records and statistics
 List of Olympic medalists in water polo (women)
 List of world champions in women's water polo
 List of World Aquatics Championships medalists in water polo

Notes

References

External links
 
 

1984 births
Living people
People from Olot
Sportspeople from the Province of Girona
Spanish female water polo players
Water polo drivers
Water polo players at the 2012 Summer Olympics
Medalists at the 2012 Summer Olympics
Olympic silver medalists for Spain in water polo
World Aquatics Championships medalists in water polo
21st-century Spanish women
Sportswomen from Catalonia
Water polo players from Catalonia